T-cell leukemia/lymphoma protein 1B is a protein that in humans is encoded by the TCL1B gene.

References

Further reading